YF-23 may refer to:

 Northrop YF-23, an American single-seat, twin-engine stealth fighter aircraft technology demonstrator designed for the United States Air Force
 YF-23 (rocket engine), a liquid rocket vernier engine, burning NO and UDMH